The intimate parts of the human body must, according to Islam, be covered by clothing. Exposing the intimate parts of the body is unlawful in Islam as the Quran instructs the covering of male and female genitals, and for adult females the breasts. Exposing them is normally considered sinful. Exposing intimate parts when needed, such as going to the toilet or bathing, falls under a specific set of rules. Precisely which body parts must be covered varies among different schools of Islamic thought.

Etymology
In Arabic, the term 'awrah or 'awrat derives from the root ‘-w-r, usually meaning "nakedness".

In Persian and Kurdish as well as Urdu, the word 'awrat derived from the Arabic 'awrah, had been used widely to mean "woman". Consulting Mohammad Moin's dictionary of Persian, 'awrah leads to three significations:

 Something that a person is ashamed of
 Young woman
 Intimate body parts

Other derivatives range in meaning from blind in one eye, to false or artificial, among others. Traditionally the word 'awrat, alongside the word za'ifeh (which derives from Arabic ḍa'īf, meaning weak) has been associated with femininity and women who lived under the protection of a man. In modern-day Iran, using the two words ( 'awrah and za'ifah) to refer to women is uncommon and is considered sexist language. Instead, the words zan and xânom are used. In Tajikistan and Uzbekistan, the word za'if is still used in the Tajik dialect of Persian and its subdialects.

In Turkish, avrat is an often derogatory term for 'woman' or 'wife'.

In the Quran

The term 'awrah as it is used in the Quran is confined neither to women nor to the body. The Quranic text reveals the use of the term in various passages Surah An-Nur and Surah Al-Ahzab.

The below verse is about privacy as the Quranic text states:

... and let those among you who have not yet come to the age of puberty ask your permission (before they come to your presence) on three occasions; before the morning prayer, and while you put off your clothes for the noonday (rest), and after the late-night prayer. (These) three times are of privacy for you, other than these times there is no sin on you or on them to move about, attending (helping) each other.

Another passage in the Quran that uses the term 'awrah, is in Surah Al-Ahzab where it concerns fleeing from battle.

It states: "A group of them ask the Prophet for leave, saying, "Our houses are 'awrah", even though their houses are not awrah. Their intent is to flee the battle." In this case, the term 'awrah means "vulnerable".

There is another context that relates the story of creation of Adam and Eve in the Garden. In these two instances, the term saw’ah is used as an equivalent to  'awrah.

The text states:

O ye children of Adam! We have bestowed dress upon you to cover your nakedness...

Another word which almost has the same meaning of  'awrah, is the word farj the plural is furuj. Another quote concerning covering the  'awrah is:

"O Prophet! Tell your wives and your daughters, and the believing women, to draw their cloaks (veils) over their bodies. That will be better that they should be known (as respectable woman) so as not to be annoyed. And Allah is Ever Oft-Forgiving, Most Merciful." -Al-Ahzab:59 (Qur'an)

The Quran admonishes Muslim women to dress modestly and cover their private areas. The Quran explicitly states that "O wives of the Prophet, you are not like anyone among women" (Quran 33: 32) and as such has separate rules specifically for the wives of the Prophet. The Qur'an tells the male believers (Muslims) to talk to the wives of the Prophet Muhammad from behind a hijab (curtain or veil).  
This passage was as follows:

While the meaning of khimār is debated, it's often believed to be a headcover that pre-islamic Arab women wore as an adornment. 

In the following verse, the wives of the Prophet and believing women are asked to draw their jilbab (outer garments) over them (when they go out), as a measure to distinguish themselves from others (as Muslim women), so that they are not harassed. Surah 33:59 reads:

In the Hadith
Shaykh Tabarsi in Majma' Al-Bayan has commented on this Hadith:

 Awrah refers to anything which can be easily harmed just like a bare or exposed place. Therefore it becomes clear that the body of a woman is referred to as vulnerable because it is like a house which contains no walls and can be easily harmed and must be covered with the appropriate clothing.

What did the jilbāb usually cover?  This is also answered in a hadith:

It was narrated from ‘Aa’ishah that Safwaan ibn al-Mu’attal al-Sulami al Dhakwaani was lagging behind the army. She said, "He came to where I had stopped and saw the black shape of a person sleeping. He recognized me when he saw me, because he had seen me before Hijāb was enjoined. I woke up when I heard him saying ‘Inna Lillaahi wa inna ilayhi raaji’oon (verily to Allaah we belong and unto Him is our return),’ and I covered my face with my Jilbāb." (Narrated by al-Bukhāri, kitāb al maghazi – bābu Hadīth ul ifk, 4141; Muslim, 2770)

The details are important, showing that Aisha was recognizable only because Safwaan knew her before the sura of the veil.  If only Muhammad's wives had covered their faces, he would have known her regardless because she would have been the only woman on that journey whose face he didn't instantly recognize, as she was the only one of his wives on that trip.  Therefore, when a woman left her house, she was enjoined to cover her entire body and also most of her face.  Note that though the man would not have ordinarily seen a woman's face, it was not an act of indecency that Aisha's face was seen.  She was not held to blame for this later.

Within the home, a head-veil alone seemed to be sufficient for a woman to be considered dressed.  The most frequently cited passage was this:

"Asma, daughter of Abu Bakr, entered upon the Apostle of Allah (Peace be upon him) wearing thin clothes. The Apostle of Allah (Peace be upon him) turned his attention from her. He said: O Asma’, when a woman reaches the age of menstruation, it does not suit her that she displays her parts of body except this and this, and he pointed to her face and hands." Abu Dawud

Asma was not mahram to Muhammad, and the fact that he did not order that her face be covered indicates face veiling was not obligatory indoors, at least, and therefore uncovering the face was not obscene even in other contexts.  There are other ahadith that state that Muhammad said that the 'awrah of women included everything except the face and the hands, and possibly the feet as long as they were still in shoes.

Not only was it traditionally required that everything that is 'awrah be covered, but it was also required that the 'awrah be covered in such a way that the shape beneath cannot be discerned.  These requirements are usually enforced today more often concerning women's 'awrah than men's.

Differences between men and women

Men

In Sunni interpretations, the 'awrah of a man refers to the part of the body from the navel to the knees. The Maliki, Shafi'i, Hanafi and Hanbali schools of thought observe that there is a difference on whether the belly button and the knee itself are included. In particular, these observations generally require that the cloth not be too thin, that it is not pale to the extent the color of the skin can be seen, that a man ensures extra covering if his genitals' shape is discernible, and that the modesty of adulthood applies once a boy becomes ten years old.

Women

Women's 'awrah is a more complicated issue and it changes according to the situation.

In ritual prayer: a woman should cover her entire body excluding her entire face and her hands to the wrist. (The Hanafis solely differ on this matter, as they consider that feet, including the ankles, also can be excluded). The part between the throat and the chin can be excluded as well. (Different scholars have different opinions on this.) A woman should cover her hair and body while performing the ritual prayer, whether she is praying in presence of her husband or she is praying alone in her chamber, as the basis for covering in prayer is different from the basis for covering in front of people.
In front of her husband: There is no restriction in Islam on what body parts a woman may show to her husband in private. The husband and wife can see any part of each other's body especially during sexual intercourse.
In privacy: It is recommended that a person cover his or her sexual organs even when alone in private. There are exceptions when there is need, such as when bathing or using the toilet.
Among other women: The 'awrah of a woman amongst other women is the same as the 'awrah of men (from her navel to her knees).  'Awrah in front of non-Muslim women is a point of debate. Some scholars say that women should cover all but the hands and face, while according to the most preferred opinion, a Muslim woman can reveal in front of a non-Muslim woman as much as she would in front of other Muslim women.
 In front of a mahram (close male relative): there are three  Sunni opinions:
It is from the shoulders and neck down (or navel) to below the knees (inclusive) (Maliki and Hanbali opinion) (Alternate Hanafi opinion)
 In front of male children: If the child understands what the 'awrah is, then it is not considered permissible for a woman to uncover her  'awrah in front of him.
 In front of non-mahram men: There is a difference of opinion on which body parts a woman should cover in front of men who are not her mahram. In the contemporary world, there is a general argument that the body of a free woman (except for her face and her hands up to her wrists/forearms) is 'awrah and therefore must be covered not only during prayer but also in public and in front of all non-mahram men. The Hanafis view the feet (including the ankles) to be excluded from 'awrah as well.

However, these views above are only the dominant view and does not represent the whole of Islam, as there are alternative views, such as the view that covering every part of a woman's body except for the face and the hands only apply during salah and ihram and the view that a woman must cover every part of her body at any time except in front of her husband.

Whether a woman was obligated to cover her face is more controversial. Most contemporary scholars agree that women's covering of the face was not mandated by the Quran or by the traditions of Muhammad. However, many classical jurists held that such covering was nonetheless strongly recommended, or even required in times of fitnah.  Al-Razi, for example, held that by covering her face a married woman made clear that she was not available. Notably, a man is permitted and even encouraged to look at the face of a woman he is considering marrying, even in countries where he normally would not be allowed to.

In the contemporary world, some Muslims insist that a woman's awrah in front of unrelated men is her entire body including her face and hands, which must be covered at all times in front of non-mahram men. Others disagree and claim it is permissible to show the face and hands.  The practice of covering the face is common in several Muslim countries, such as Saudi Arabia, Bahrain, Yemen, Oman and Afghanistan. It is not common in other majority Muslim countries like Malaysia, Indonesia, present-day Iran, present-day Turkey and the majority of South Asia. These differences reflect different interpretations and understanding of Sharia regarding wearing a niqab. However, when performing Hajj or Umrah it is actually forbidden for the woman to cover the face, the rest is covered as when performing prayers. 

There is a difference of opinion among scholars with regards to how much should be uncovered for a woman in front of other women and a man in front of another man. In one hadith narrated by Abu Saʽid al-Khudri, the prophet said, "A man should not look at the private parts of another man, and a woman should not look at the private parts of another woman. A man should not lie with another man without wearing lower garment under one cover; and a woman should not be lie with another woman without wearing lower garment under one cover." (Abu Dawud – authenticated by Sheikh Naseeruddeen-al-Albani.)

Relation with hijab

Some Muslim women, particularly those living in some parts of the Middle East and South Asia wear the hijab headscarf. The type most commonly worn in the West is a rectangular scarf that covers the head and neck but leaves the face visible. Other styles also cover the hair, neck and shoulders completely, but the face and the hands are not covered, as they are not considered awrah for those Muslims who wear it.

Female voice

According to most scholars, the woman's voice is not (see quotation) awrah in principle, for according to the Hadith, women used to complain to the Prophet and ask him about Islamic matters.

Also, according to the tradition, in the ritual prayer, a woman should invite the attention of the Imam by clapping, instead of saying "Subhanallah" which is for men. There is a difference of opinion whether or not a woman can recite the Quran when in the presence of non-mahram men.

Certain scholars have concluded from the above differences that a woman's voice is also her awrah in some cases.

Debates, deliberations and activism 

Specially since modern times the concepts of awarah (Intimate parts), Haya (Modesty), various levels of seclusion of Muslim women, and about extent to which Muslim restrain their exposure of bodily aspects and association vis a vis Islamic clothing; not only were contested from non-Muslim and ex-Muslim but also continuously been matter of discussions, deliberations, debates, movements and also been part of advice literature, within Muslim societies including that of common Muslim individuals, various traditional schools scholars, intelligentsia, numerous political dispensations and also at times contested by individuals and groups of cultural Muslims; liberals and progressives, modernists and Islamic feminists. 
In the 1930s just after Turkish reformations under Kemal Atatürk, Malays (Malaysians) debated how far to stick to traditional Islamic social restraints over awrah – commonly referred as 'Aurat' in Indonesia and Malaysia – and modesty in contemporary Islamic clothing and whether western modernism is really essential and beneficial.

See also 

 Haya (Islam)
 Hijab
 Islam and clothing
 Namus (Honor)
 Niqab
 Purdah
 Sartorial hijab
 Tzeniut- similar doctrine in Judaism
 Islamic toilet etiquette
 Gender segregation and Muslims

References

Islamic female clothing
Modesty in Islam